The Planetary Exploration of China (PEC), also known as Tianwen, is the robotic interplanetary spaceflight program conducted by the China National Space Administration (CNSA). The program aims to explore planets of the Solar System, starting from Mars, and will be expanded to Jupiter and more in the future.

The program was initially known as the Mars mission of China at the early stage. It was later announced as Planetary Exploration of China in April 2020. The series of missions was named Tianwen.

The first mission of the program, Tianwen-1 Mars exploration mission, began on July 23, 2020. A spacecraft, which consisted of an orbiter, a lander, and a rover, was launched by a Long March 5 rocket from Wenchang. The Tianwen-1 was inserted into Mars orbit in February 2021 after a seven-month journey, followed by a successful soft landing of the lander and Zhurong rover on May 14, 2021, making China the second country in the world to successfully soft-land a fully operational spacecraft on Mars surface after the United States.

Future missions, including near-Earth asteroid sample return, Mars sample return and Jupiter system exploration, have been planned by PEC.

History

China began its first interplanetary exploration attempt in 2011 by sending Yinghuo-1, a Mars orbiter, in a joint mission with Russia. Yet it failed to leave Earth orbit due to the failure of Russian launch vehicle.

On December 13, 2012, the Chinese lunar probe Chang'e 2 made a flyby of the asteroid 4179 Toutatis in an extended mission. With a distance of over 7 million kilometers away from Earth, Chang'e 2 became China's first interplanetary probe which tested the limit of China's deep space communication capability.

On April 22, 2016, Xu Dazhe, head of the CNSA, announced that the Mars mission had been approved on January 11, 2016. A probe would be sent to Martian orbit and attempt to land on Mars in 2020.

On November 14, 2019, CNSA invited some foreign embassies and international organizations to witness hovering and obstacle avoidance test for Mars Lander of China's first Mars exploration mission at the extraterrestrial celestial landing test site. It was the first public appearance of China's Mars exploration mission.

On April 24, 2020, Planetary Exploration of China was formally announced by CNSA, along with the name "Tianwen" and emblem of the program. The first mission of the program, the Mars mission to be carried out in 2020, was named Tianwen-1.

The first mission of the program, Tianwen-1 Mars exploration mission, was launched on July 23, 2020. The Tianwen-1 was inserted into Mars orbit in February 2021 after a seven-month journey, followed by a successful soft landing of the lander and Zhurong rover on May 14, 2021. The Zhurong rover was deployed onto the Martian surface from its landing platform and began its exploratory mission on May 22. On June 1, CNSA released multiple high-resolution images taken on Martian surface, confirming the success of the mission.

On June 12, 2021, CNSA announced the future plans for near-Earth asteroid sample return, Mars sample return and Jupiter system exploration.

Name and emblem
The program's name "Tianwen", which literally means "questions to heaven", derived from the eponymous poem by the famous ancient poet Qu Yuan of the state of Chu during the Warring States period (475–221 BC). The name represents the Chinese people's relentless pursuit of truth, the country's cultural inheritance of its understanding of nature and universe, as well as the unending explorations in science and technology.

The emblem of PEC and its missions consist of eight planets in the Solar System and their orbits in the shape of the Latin letter 'c', referring to China, cooperation, and the cosmic velocity required to undertake planetary exploration.

Launch facilities

Wenchang Spacecraft Launch Site

Wenchang Spacecraft Launch Site is China's newest space vehicle launch facility. It is the only launch site in China capable of launching China's most powerful rocket Long March 5, which offers the maximum payload capacity into deep space.

Tianwen-1, the first mission of PEC, was launched from Wenchang.

Supporting facilities

Monitoring and control center
 Beijing Aerospace Flight Control Center is the center which is responsible for command and decision making, control and computing, data processing, information exchange, and spacecraft management.

Chinese deep space network
The deep space monitoring and control network provides vital tracking, telemetry and command (TT&C) capability to the interplanetary spaceflights. Participating facilities include:
 Xi'an Satellite Control Center is the facility that manages and operates the Chinese Deep Space Network.
 Jiamusi ground station with one 66-meter antenna locates in Jiamusi, Heilongjiang, the easternmost of China, operational since 2012.
 Kashgar ground station with four 35-meter antenna array locates in Kashgar, Xinjiang, the westernmost of China, operational since 2012 and upgraded in 2020.
 Neuquén ground station with one 35-meter antenna locates Neuquén, Argentina, operational since 2017.

Extraterrestrial celestial landing test site
Located in Huailai County, Hebei, the extraterrestrial celestial landing test site is the largest facility of the same kind in Asia.

The facility consists of six 140-meter tall cranes and one central platform, which is connected with the cranes by 36 cables. The movement of the platform provides simulation of the Mars gravity environment to the lander hung below it. The ground of is paved with special material, which can be manipulated to form the shapes of pits or slopes.

The extraterrestrial celestial landing test site is used to test the lander's capability of hovering, obstacle avoidance and slowing down.

Current and future missions

Tianwen-1

As China's first independent Mars exploration mission, Tianwen-1 set out to accomplish three major goals simultaneously: orbiting, landing on, and roving Mars via a single set of spacecraft. On July 23, 2020, the Tianwen-1 spacecraft stack, consisting of an orbiter, a lander, a rover,  deployable and remote cameras launched from Wenchang, marking the beginning of the mission.

After a 202-day journey through interplanetary space, Tianwen-1 inserted itself into Martian orbit on February 10, 2021, thereby becoming China's first Mars orbiter. During this long journey, it deployed a deployable camera in September 2020 whose imagery confirmed the successful launch and Mars transit phase of the spacecraft. Subsequently, it performed several orbital maneuvers and began surveying target landing sites on Mars in preparation for the coming landing attempt.

On May 14, 2021, the lander and the Zhurong rover separated from Tianwen-1's orbiter. After experiencing Mars atmospheric entry that lasted about nine minutes, the lander and rover made a successful soft landing in the Utopia Planitia region of Mars. With the landing, China became the second country to operate a fully functional spacecraft on Martian surface, after the United States.

On May 22, 2021, the Zhurong rover deployed onto the Martian surface from its landing platform and began its exploratory mission. During its deployment, the Rover's instrument, Mars Climatic Station (MCS), recorded the sound, acting as the second Martian sound instrument to record Martian sounds successfully after Mars 2020 Perseverance rover's microphones. During this journey it deployed the remote selfie camera on June 1, 2021, whose imagery confirmed the successful landing of the rover and lander. Later on, the orbiter released another deployable camera in Mars Orbit on 31 December 2021 who imaged the orbiter and Utopia Planitia where Zhurong rover is operating and an unknown selfie stick payload was deployed to working position on orbiter to image orbiter's key components and Chinese flag on orbiter on January 30, 2022, for Chinese New Year.

Near-Earth asteroid sample-return and main-belt comet orbiter mission (planned)

The mission to return samples from a near-Earth asteroid and to orbit a main-belt comet is planned to be conducted around 2025, according to CNSA announcement on June 12, 2021.

Mars sample-return mission (planned)
In December 2020, the CNSA announced plans for a Mars sample-return mission to be carried out later in the decade. In a June 2022 announcement, the mission's name was revealed to be Tianwen-3 and further details were announced, including a 2028 launch date for a 2031 return to Earth. One spacecraft would land on the martian surface to collect samples and send the material back to Martian orbit. A second spacecraft would take the samples which would then be carried by a return capsule back to earth.

Venus exploration mission (planned) 

In 2022, the CNSA revealed VOICE (Venus Volcano Imaging and Climate Explorer), an orbiter mission to launch in 2026 and arrive at Venus in 2027. This mission was expected to last 3-4 years and include the following payloads, a Microwave Radiometric Sounder (MRS), Polarimetric Synthetic Aperture Radar (PolSAR), and Ultraviolet-Visible-Near Infrared Multispectral Imager (UVN-MSI). VOICE would return images of the surface with one-meter resolution and search the clouds for habitability and biosignatures.

Jupiter system exploration mission (planned)

China is planning a mission to Jupiter and possibly to the Jovian moon Callisto. One of two possible mission architectures ("Jupiter Callisto Orbiter" and "Jupiter System Observer") will likely be launched in 2029 and arrive at the Jovian system in 2035, after one Venus flyby and two Earth flybys. The mission will also include an additional probe that will conduct a flyby of Uranus sometime after 2040.

Mars crewed mission (planned)
According to Wang Xiaojun, head of the state-owned China Academy of Launch Vehicle Technology, China plans to send its first crew to Mars and planning base for regular crewed missions, primary launches to Mars are planned for 2033, 2035, 2037, 2041.

List of missions

Mars missions

See also

 Chinese space program
 Chinese Lunar Exploration Program
Chinese Deep Space Network
 Interplanetary spaceflight
 List of interplanetary voyages
 Exploration of Mars
 List of missions to Mars

References 

21st century in China
China National Space Administration